Rashard Bradshaw, better known as Cakes da Killa, is an American rap artist who fuses genres of hip hop, house, and electronic dance music. He came to prominence in the "queer explosion" of hip hop music stemming from New York in 2012 and is among the credited performers for the current trend of acceptance of LGBT people in the rap community. Bradshaw is currently based in Atlanta and his latest release Muvaland, a hip house EP, was released on November 13, 2020, via Classic Music Company.

Career

2011: Career beginnings and Easy Bake Oven
Rashard Bradshaw started rapping in high school for fun before considering it as a career. He first began writing tracks to instrumentals he found on the internet and posting them to Facebook. In 2011, his homemade demos came to the attention of an executive producer named Stixx, who invited Bradshaw to appear on the mixtape Downtown Mayhem Vol. 1 alongside Rip The Ruler. Bradshaw then went on to release his own debut mixtape Easy Bake Oven, Vol. 1 through Stixx' Downtown Mayhem label.

As an emerging artist in the hip hop genre — along with fellow LGBT artists such as Le1f, Mykki Blanco, and House of Ladosha — Bradshaw gained popularity through media interest in LGBT figures and themes in hip hop and rap, having been written about in a Pitchfork article about said "movement".

Bradshaw cites Erykah Badu, Busta Rhymes, Remy Ma, Lil' Kim, Foxy Brown, Cam'ron, Nicki Minaj, and Bette Midler as influences.

2012-15: The Eulogy, Hunger Pangs, and mainstream success
Released for free on Mishka NYC's website, Bradshaw's second mixtape The Eulogy was released to overwhelming popularity when it was reviewed positively by Pitchfork. Miles Raymer of Pitchfork compared his raunchy style to Lil' Kim and praised the production of the mixtape. According to an interview in Paper Magazine, the mixtape's title originally referred to Bradshaw's plan to end his musical career after its release, but he's since changed his mind.

Prior to making his rap career full-time, Bradshaw was an intern at Paper Magazine and worked in the nightlife industry, promoting parties and working doors in New York City. In May 2013, Bradshaw completed his bachelor's degree in fashion studies at Montclair State University. In September 2013, Bradshaw released an EP for his hit single "I Run This Club", which samples M.I.A.'s song by the same name from her 2010 mixtape Vicki Leekx. He later released a Remixes version of this EP which included features from Fat Tony, Siyoung, and Spank Rock on the title track.

In June 2014, Bradshaw released a nine-track mixtape titled Hunger Pangs. To promote this mixtape, Bradshaw appeared on the Hot 97 radio show Ebro in the Morning where he freestyled live on air. Throughout the interview, Bradshaw's sexuality kept being a topic of discussion, with Ebro calling him a "gay rapper" and Bradshaw correcting him to call himself "a rapper that happens to be gay".

In 2015, Bradshaw released a 5 track EP titled #IMF (In My Feelings), which chronicled a modern-day tale of star crossed lovers from inception to resolution.

2016-present: Hedonism and MUVALAND
In October 2016, Bradshaw released his highly anticipated debut album Hedonism on Ruffians. Through this body of work, Bradshaw moved past his critic's labels and further solidified his own unique place in hip-hop. In October 2019, Bradshaw appeared on the Netflix reality competition Rhythm + Flow, where he auditioned in front of Cardi B, Jadakiss, and Fat Joe. Following this appearance, Bradshaw has released a handful of singles in 2020, most recently "DON DADA" off his EP MUVALAND, which was released in November 2020.

Discography

Albums

Extended plays

Mixtapes

Singles

Guest appearances

Filmography

Television

Music videos

See also
 LGBT culture in New York City
 List of LGBT people from New York City

References

External links
 Cakes da Killa on Facebook
 Cakes da Killa on SoundCloud
 Cakes da Killa on Twitter
 Cakes da Killa on Tumblr

American gay musicians
LGBT African Americans
LGBT people from New Jersey
LGBT rappers
Living people
Rappers from New Jersey
Year of birth missing (living people)
21st-century American rappers
People from Teaneck, New Jersey
21st-century African-American musicians
21st-century American LGBT people